Bukoba Airport  is a domestic airport located in the city of Bukoba, the capital of the Kagera Region in northwest Tanzania. It is adjacent to Lake Victoria.

The Bukoba non-directional beacon (Ident: BK) is located on the field.

A new asphalt runway and other improvements were completed between April 2011 and April 2014.

Airlines and destinations

Statistics

Accidents and incidents
On 6 November 2022, Precision Air Flight 494 from Dar es Salaam with 43 people on board hit the lake when approaching the airport. The crash resulted in 19 fatalities.
On Thursday, November 17 2022 Air Tanzania Company Limited (ATCL) plane failed to land at Bukoba Airport due to bad weather, the Tanzania Civil Aviation Authority (TCAA) confirmed. The pilot of the national carrier’s Bombardier plane diverted the flight to Mwanza Airport, where all passengers were offloaded safely, and the plane had to leave for Dar es Salaam to proceed with other schedules.

See also

List of airports in Tanzania
Transport in Tanzania

References

External links
OpenStreetMap - Bukoba
OurAirports - Bukoba

Airports in Tanzania
Bukoba
Buildings and structures in the Kagera Region